is a Japanese professional shogi player ranked 6-dan.

Early life
Murata was born on July 14, 1986, in Uozu, Toyama.  He learned how to play shogi when he was about five years old from his father. In 1998, Murata took the entrance exam for the Japan Shogi Association's apprentice school, but failed; he tried again the following year and was accepted at the rank of 6-kyū under the guidance of shogi professional .

Murata was promoted to the rank of 3-dan in 2004 at the age of eighteen, and obtained full professional status and the rank of 4-dan three years later after winning the 41st 3-dan League with a record of 15 wins and 3 losses.

Promotion history
Murata's promotion history is as follows:
 6-kyū: September 1999
 4-dan: October 1, 2007
 5-dan: March 6, 2012
 6-dan: November 7, 2017

References

External links
ShogiHub: Murata, Akihiro

Japanese shogi players
Living people
Professional shogi players
Professional shogi players from Toyama Prefecture
People from Uozu, Toyama
1986 births